Nika Prevc (born 15 March 2005) is a Slovenian ski jumper.

Career
Prevc made her FIS Ski Jumping World Cup debut in November 2021 in Nizhny Tagil. Her best World Cup result is third place, achieved on 10 February 2023 in Hinzenbach.

Personal life
Prevc was born in Kranj to Božidar and Julijana Prevc; the family has since been living in the village of Dolenja Vas. She has three brothers and a sister. All three of her brothers, Peter, Cene and Domen, are also FIS Ski Jumping World Cup jumpers. Her father, who owns a furniture business, is also an international ski jumping referee.

References

External links 

2005 births
Living people
Sportspeople from Kranj
Slovenian female ski jumpers
Prevc family
21st-century Slovenian women